Agago is a town in the Northern Region of Uganda. It is the chief political, administrative, and commercial center of the Agago District.

Location
The geographic coordinates of the town are 2°59'05.0"N, 33°19'50.0"E (Latitude:2.9847; Longitude:33.3306).

Population
In 2015, the projected population of the town was 6,100. In 2020, the mid-year population was projected at 6,700. It was calculated that the population of Agago Municipality grew at an average annual rate of 1.9 percent, between 2015 and 2020.

Points of interest
The following points of interest lie within the town limits or close to the edges of town: (a) the offices of Agago Town Council (b) Agago central market and (c) the Kalongo-Patongo road, passing to the immediate east of town in a north/south direction.

See also
Patongo
Adilang
Acholi people

References

External links
Agago Sleeps With Dusk 
Map of Agago And Vicinity At Mapcarta.com

Agago District
Acholi sub-region
Populated places in Northern Region, Uganda